TU Wien, also known as the Vienna University of Technology, is a public research university in Vienna, Austria.

The university's teaching and research is focused on engineering, computer science, and natural sciences. It currently has about 28,100 students (29% women), eight faculties and about 5,000 staff members (3,800 academics).

History
The institution was founded in 1815 by Emperor Francis I of Austria as the k.k. Polytechnische Institut (Imperial-Royal Polytechnic Institute). The first rector was Johann Joseph von Prechtl. It was renamed the Technische Hochschule (College of Technology) in 1872. When it began granting doctoral and higher degrees in 1975, it was renamed the Technische Universität Wien (Vienna University of Technology).

Academic reputation 
As a university of technology, TU Wien covers a wide spectrum of scientific concepts from abstract pure research and the fundamental principles of science to applied technological research and partnership with industry.

TU Wien is ranked #192 by the QS World University Ranking, #406 by the Center of World University Rankings, and it is positioned among the best 401-500 higher education institutions globally  by the Times Higher Education World University Rankings. The computer science department has been consistently ranked among the top 100 in the world by the QS World University Ranking and The Times Higher Education World University Rankings respectively.

Organization 
TU Wien has eight faculties led by deans: Architecture and Planning, Chemistry, Civil Engineering, Computer Sciences, Electrical Engineering and Information Technology, Mathematics and Geoinformation, Mechanical and Industrial Engineering, and Physics.

The University is led by the Rector and four Vice Rectors (responsible for Research, Academic Affairs, Finance as well as Human Resources and Gender). The Senate has 26 members. The University Council, consisting of seven members, acts as a supervisory board.

Research 
Development work in almost all areas of technology is encouraged by the interaction between basic research and the different fields of engineering sciences at TU Wien. Also, the framework of cooperative projects with other universities, research institutes and business sector partners is established by the research section of TU Wien. TU Wien has sharpened its research profile by defining competence fields and setting up interdisciplinary collaboration centres, and clearer outlines will be developed.

Research focus points of TU Wien are introduced as computational science and engineering, quantum physics and quantum technologies, materials and matter, information and communication technology and energy and environment.

The EU Research Support (EURS) provides services at TU Wien and informs both researchers and administrative staff in preparing and carrying out EU research projects.

Notable faculty and alumni 

 Adolph Giesl-Gieslingen (1903–1992), Austrian locomotive designer and engineer
 Alexander Meissner (1883 – 1958), Austrian engineer and physicist, co-inventor of the Electronic oscillator
 Alfred Preis (1911–1993), designer of the USS Arizona Memorial in Pearl Harbor
 Benno Mengele (1898–1971), Austrian electrical engineer
 Camillo Sitte (1843-1903), Austrian architect
 Christian Andreas Doppler, (1803–1853), Austrian mathematician and physicist
 Edmund Hlawka (1916-2009), Austrian mathematician
 Edo Šen (1877–1949), Croatian architect
 Elfriede Tungl (1922-1981) civil engineer, first Austrian woman to earn a doctorate in civil engineering, in 1973 became the first female associate professor at TU Wien.
 Ernst Hiesmayr (1920-2006), architect, artist and former rector of the Technical University Vienna
 Ferdinand Piëch (1937-2019), Austrian business magnate, engineer and executive who was the chairman of the supervisory board of Volkswagen Group
 Franz Pitzinger (1858–1933), Constructor General of the Austrian Navy
 Gottfried Ungerboeck (1940), inventor of trellis modulation, IBM Fellow
 Günter Blöschl (born 1961), Austrian hydrologist
 Hannspeter Winter (1941-2006), Austrian plasma physicist
 Heinz Zemanek (1920-2014), Austrian computer pioneer
 Hellmuth Stachel (born 1942), Austrian mathematician
 Herman Potočnik (1892–1929), Slovene space pioneer
 Hermann Knoflacher (born 1940), Austrian engineer
 Hubert Petschnigg (1913–1997), architect (completed his studies at TU Graz)
 Hugo Ehrlich (1879–1936), Croatian architect
 Ignaz Sowinski (1858–1917), architect
 Ina Wagner (born 1946), Austrian physicist, sociologist, professor of computer science 1987 – 2011, TU's second ever female professor
 Ingeborg Hochmair (born 1953), electrical engineer, developed the first microelectronic, multi-channel cochlear implant
 Irfan Skiljan, author of the image viewer software Irfanview
 Jörg Streli (1940–2019), Austrian architect
 Karl Gölsdorf (1861–1916), Austrian engineer and locomotive designer
 Leon Kellner, grammarian, Shakespearean, and Zionist
 Marie-Therese Hohenberg, Austrian architect  (born 1972)
 Milan Vidmar (1885-1962), Slovene electrical engineer
 Milutin Milanković (1879–1958), Serbian geophysicist and civil engineer
 Ottó Titusz Bláthy (1860–1939), Hungarian mechanical engineer
 Paul Eisler (1907–1992), inventor of the printed circuit
 Paul Schneider-Esleben (1915–2005), visiting professor of architecture
 Peter Schattschneider (1950), Austrian physicist
 Peter Skalicky (born 1941), rector of the Vienna University of Technology from 1991-2011
 Richard von Mises (1883–1953), scientist
 Rudolf Steiner (1861-1925), Austrian philosopher and transdisciplinary researcher
 Rudolph Michael Schindler (1887–1953), early Modern architect
 Siegfried Becher (1806–1873), professor of economics
 Silke Bühler-Paschen, professor of physics
 Tillman Gerngross, Professor of Engineering at Dartmouth College, leading entrepreneur and bioengineer, founder of GlycoFi and Adimab
 Viktor Kaplan (1876–1934), inventor of the Kaplan turbine
 Vinzenz Bronzin (1872-1970), Italian mathematics professor, and pioneering finance theorist
 Yordan Milanov (1867–1932), one of the leading Bulgarian architects from the end of 19th and the beginning of the 20th century
 Zvonimir Richtmann (1901–1941), Croatian physicist, philosopher, politician and publicist

Library 
The TU Wien Bibliothek, the university library, was founded in 1815. The main library building was designed by the architects Justus Dahinden, and partners. Completed in 1987, it features owl sculptures by the Swiss artist Bruno Weber. The main library has six floors of open access areas and reading rooms, with around 700 study desks.

Sports 
The University hosted the IFIUS World Interuniversity Games in October 2007.

See also 
TU Austria

Notes and references

External links 

 
 Continuing Education Center – TU Wien (MBA programs, MSc programs, certified)
 Curricula (fields of study and courses)
 TISS Information System (e.g. links to Publications Database)
 TU Wien on Youtube (English playlist)

 
Universities and colleges in Vienna
Educational institutions established in 1815
Engineering universities and colleges in Austria
1815 establishments in the Austrian Empire